Andrew Schneider (born March 29, 1972) is a Canadian former professional ice hockey winger who played in the National Hockey League (NHL).

Career 
Schneider signed with the expansion Ottawa Senators on October 9, 1992, and made his professional debut with the Senators' American Hockey League (AHL) affiliate, the New Haven Senators. After 19 games with New Haven, he was returned to his junior team, the Swift Current Broncos of the Western Hockey League (WHL). Schneider led the Broncos to the President's Cup championship and was named WHL Playoff MVP. He made his NHL debut with the Senators during the 1993–94 season, going scoreless in ten games played. 

After the 1996–97 season, Schneider left North America and played the next fourteen seasons in Europe, primarily in the German Deutsche Eishockey Liga (DEL) and the Austrian Erste Bank Eishockey Liga (EBEL). He retired following the 2010–11 season and is an amateur scout for the Columbus Blue Jackets.

Awards
1992–93 WHL East Second Team All-Star
1992–93 WHL Playoff MVP

Career statistics

References

External links

Living people
Canadian ice hockey left wingers
Columbus Blue Jackets scouts
Düsseldorfer EG players
Hamburg Freezers players
Ice hockey people from Edmonton
EC KAC players
Leksands IF players
Manitoba Moose (IHL) players
Minnesota Moose players
München Barons players
New Haven Senators players
Ottawa Senators players
Prince Edward Island Senators players
Revier Löwen players
Schwenninger Wild Wings players
Seattle Thunderbirds players
Swift Current Broncos players
1972 births
Undrafted National Hockey League players
Canadian expatriate ice hockey players in Austria
Canadian expatriate ice hockey players in Germany
Canadian expatriate ice hockey players in Sweden